Ortharbela cliftoni is a moth in the family Cossidae. It is found in Tanzania, where it has been recorded from the East Usambara Mountains. The habitat consists of submontane forests.

The length of the forewings is about 8.5 mm. The forewings are buckthorn brown with tawny-olive spots along the costal margin, edged with sepia. These same spots are found along the termen. There is a large sepia patch from near the apex. The hindwings are olive brown.

Etymology
The species is named for Mike Peter Clifton.

References

External links
Natural History Museum Lepidoptera generic names catalog

Endemic fauna of Tanzania
Metarbelinae
Moths described in 2009